The  is one of the expressways of Japan which goes from Fukuoka to Takeo running through the prefecture of Saga and the northern half of the Nagasaki prefecture. The total length is 150 km.

Part of the road is specified as Route 497. This road has two toll zones. The Fukuoka and Maebaru toll zone is managed by Fukuoka Prefectural Road Public Corporation. The Takeo and Sasebo toll zone is managed by West Nippon Expressway Company. The other roadway is managed by MLIT. This road is connected to Fukuoka Expressway Circular Route in Nishi-ku, Fukuoka, and to Nagasaki Expressway in Takeo. From Nijō to Nijō Shika Interchange this expressway overlaps a section of Nijō Hamatama road.

Overview
The first section of the expressway was opened to traffic in 1988. As of April 2016 the expressway was incomplete in many areas. The next sections were scheduled to open in 2017 (Minamihata Taniguchi Interchange to Imari Higashi Interchange) and (Imabuku Interchange to Tsukinokawa Interchange). After this, most of the incomplete areas were to be built according to the New Direct Control System, whereby the burden for construction costs will be shared by the national and local governments and no tolls were to be collected. Currently the section between Nijō Shikaka Interchange and Minamihata Taniguchi Interchange, Yamashiro Kubara Interchange and Imabuku Interchange, and Saza Interchange and Sasebo Daitō Interchange operates according to this principle.

The expressway is four lanes wide from Fukushige Junction to Higashi Intersection (temporary interchange) and Saza Interchange to Sasebo Chūō Interchange, and two lanes for all remaining sections.

History 

 March 24, 1988, a section from Sasebo Daitō to Hasami Arita Interchanges was opened to traffic.
 November 30, 1989, a section from Hasami Arita to Takeo Minami Interchange was opened to traffic.
 January 26, 1990, a section from Takeo Minami Interchange to Takeo Junction was opened to traffic with another freeway.
 March 26, 1993, a section from Susenji Interchange to Higashi Intersection (temporary interchange) was opened to traffic.
 April 17, 1998, a section from Sasebo Minato to Sasebo Daitō Interchange was opened to traffic.
 September 26, 1998, a section from Jyūrokuchō to Susenji Interchanges was opened to traffic.
 October 13, 2001, a section from Fukushige Junction to Jyūrokuchō Interchange was opened to traffic with another freeway.
 November 2003, a section from Fukushige Junction to Maebaru Interchange which made with four lanes.
 December 18, 2005, a section from Hamatama to Karatsu Interchange was opened to traffic.
 December 12, 2009, a section from Nijō Shikaka to Hamatama Interchange was opened to traffic with another freeway.
 March 20, 2010, a section from Ainoura Nakazato to Sasebo Minato Interchanges was opened to traffic.
 February 26, 2011, a section from Fukushige Junction to the east was opened with other freeway.
 September 13, 2011, a section from Saza to Ainoura Nakazato Interchange was opened to traffic.
 March 24, 2012, a section from Karatsu to Karatsu Chichika Yamada Interchange was opened to traffic.
 March 23, 2013, a section from Karatsu Chichika Yamada to Kitahata Interchange was opened to traffic.
 February 1, 2015, a section from Kitahata to Minamihata Taniguchi Interchange was opened to traffic.
 March 14, 2015, a section from Yamashiro Kubara to Imabuku Interchange was opened to traffic.
 November 5, 2017, a section from Imabuku to Tsukinokawa Interchange was opened to traffic.
 March 31, 2018, a section from Minamihata Taniguchi to Imari Higashi Interchange was opened to traffic.
 December 15, 2018, a section from Tsukinokawa to Matsuura Interchange was opened to traffic.

Interchanges 

 IC - interchange, SIC - smart interchange, JCT - junction, SA - service area, PA - parking area, BS - bus stop, TN - tunnel, BR - bridge, TB - toll gate
 Bus stops labeled "○" are currently in use; those marked "◆" are closed.

Expressways in Japan
Kyushu region
Roads in Fukuoka Prefecture
Roads in Nagasaki Prefecture
Roads in Saga Prefecture